Aphomia sopozhnikovi is a moth of the family Pyralidae first described by Leonid Konstantinovich Krulikovsky in 1909. It is found in Sri Lanka.

References

Moths of Asia
Moths described in 1909
Tirathabini